Cork South-East was a parliamentary constituency represented in Dáil Éireann, the lower house of the Irish parliament or Oireachtas from 1937 to 1948. The constituency elected 3 deputies (Teachtaí Dála, commonly known as TDs) to the Dáil, on the system of proportional representation by means of the single transferable vote (PR-STV).

History 
The constituency was created under the Electoral (Revision of Constituencies) Act 1935, for the 1937 general election to the Dáil Éireann. It succeeded the old Cork East constituency. It was abolished under the Electoral (Amendment) Act 1947, when it was replaced by the new constituency of Cork South.

Boundaries 
It consisted of the district electoral divisions of: 
"Ballincollig, Ballintemple, Ballycotton, Ballyfeard, Ballyfoyle, Ballygarvan, Ballymartle, Ballynaglogh, Ballyspillane, Bishopstown, Blackpool, Blarney, Caherlag, Carrigaline (Cork), Carrigaline (Kinsale), Carrignavar, Carrigrohane Beg, Carrigtwohill, Castlemartyr, Clonmult, Cloyne, Cobh Rural, Corkbeg, Cullen, Dangan, Douglas, Dripsey, Dunderrow, Dungourney, Farrenbrien, Firmount, Garryvoe, Glenville, Greenfort, Ightermurragh, Inch, Inishkenny, Killeagh (Cork), Kilmonoge, Kilpatrick, Kinure, Knockantota, Knockraha, Lehenagh, Liscleary, Lisgoold, Matehy, Middleton Rural, Mogeely, Monkstown Rural, Nohaval, Ovens, Rathcooney, Riverstown, Rostellan, St. Mary's, Templebodan, Templebreedy, Templemichael, Templenacarriga and Whitechurch and the Urban Districts of Cobh, Midleton and Passage West in the administrative county of Cork".

TDs

Elections

1944 general election

1943 general election

1938 general election

1937 general election

See also 
Dáil constituencies
Politics of the Republic of Ireland
Historic Dáil constituencies
Elections in the Republic of Ireland

References

External links
Oireachtas Members Database

Dáil constituencies in the Republic of Ireland (historic)
Historic constituencies in County Cork
1937 establishments in Ireland
1948 disestablishments in Ireland
Constituencies established in 1937
Constituencies disestablished in 1948